Venugopalaswamy Temple is a Hindu temple located in the village of Kaliappettai in the Kanchipuram district of Tamil Nadu, India. The temple is dedicated to Krishna.

History 
Kaliappettai was founded as an agraharam village, Doddacharpuram, in the 17th century AD. It is located on the banks of the Palar River.

References 

 
 

Hindu temples in Kanchipuram district
Krishna temples